Angéline Joly (born 28 February 1974) is a former Swiss female mountain runner, world champion at the World Long Distance Mountain Running Championships (2004).

Biography
Joly was bronze medal at individual senior level at the European Mountain Running Championships (2005) and one time gold medal with the national team (2007). And silver medal with the national team at the World Mountain Running Championships (2009).

She also won Matterhorn Ultraks in 2005.

References

External links
 

1974 births
Living people
Swiss female long-distance runners
Swiss female mountain runners
World Long Distance Mountain Running Championships winners
Sportspeople from the canton of Neuchâtel